Vampire: The Dark Ages is a tabletop role-playing game in the World of Darkness series, where players take the roles of vampires and other supernatural beings in 1197–1242. It was first released by White Wolf Publishing in 1996, as a spin-off from their 1991 game Vampire: The Masquerade; it was released in new editions in 2002 (Dark Ages: Vampire) and 2015 (Twentieth Anniversary Edition), each of which updated the game rules. These have been supported with supplementary game books, expanding the game mechanics and setting.

The books from the game's original run in 1996–2004 were published by White Wolf Publishing, sometimes under their imprint Black Dog Game Factory for books considered more adult. Onyx Path Publishing, a company formed by ex–White Wolf Publishing staff, released one more supplement for Dark Ages: Vampire in 2014, and are the primary publisher of the Twentieth Anniversary Edition books.

The supplements include: the Libellus Sanguinis series, describing groups of vampire clans in medieval times; the Clanbook series, covering single vampire clans; the By Night series, describing real-world locations as they are portrayed in the setting; the Road line of books about vampire philosophies; guides to the game; and various other books. The game line was a commercial success, and the best selling of White Wolf Publishing's role-playing games with historical settings; it also performed well for Onyx Path Publishing, whose crowdfunding campaign for the Twentieth Anniversary Edition production broke their participation records.

Books

First edition (1996–2002)

Dark Ages: Vampire (2002–2004 and 2014)

Twentieth Anniversary Edition (2015–2019)

Notes

References

External links
 

Vampire: The Dark Ages
Vampire: The Dark Ages
Vampire: The Masquerade